Zerbo is a comune (municipality) in the Province of Pavia in the Italian region Lombardy, located about 45 km southeast of Milan and about 20 km southeast of Pavia. As of 31 December 2004, it had a population of 465 and an area of 6.4 km².

Zerbo borders the following municipalities: Arena Po, Costa de' Nobili, Pieve Porto Morone, San Zenone al Po.

Demographic evolution

References

Cities and towns in Lombardy